Prisad Island is the rocky island off the north coast of Low Island in the South Shetland Islands extending 640 m in southwest-northeast direction and 520 m wide.  It is separated from Limets Peninsula by a 60 m wide passage.

The feature is named "after the settlements of Prisad in Northeastern and Southeastern Bulgaria."

Location
British mapping in 2009.

See also
 List of Antarctic and subantarctic islands

Maps

 South Shetland Islands: Smith and Low Islands. Scale 1:150000 topographic map No. 13677. British Antarctic Survey, 2009
 Antarctic Digital Database (ADD). Scale 1:250000 topographic map of Antarctica. Scientific Committee on Antarctic Research (SCAR). Since 1993, regularly upgraded and updated

Notes

References
 Prisad Island. SCAR Composite Antarctic Gazetteer.
 Bulgarian Antarctic Gazetteer. Antarctic Place-names Commission. (details in Bulgarian, basic data in English)

External links
 Prisad Island. Copernix satellite image

Islands of the South Shetland Islands
Bulgaria and the Antarctic